Soil carbon sponge (or soil sponge) is porous, well-aggregated soil in good health, better able to absorb and retain water. Australian microbiologist and climatologist, Walter Jehne, articulated the concept of the soil carbon sponge in his 2017 paper, Regenerate Earth, connecting soil carbon with a restored water cycle able induce planetary cooling through evaporative cooling and higher reflectance of denser green vegetation. Cooling from increased cloud formation is another benefit of soil regeneration anticipated by Jehne.

A soil carbon sponge has densities much lighter (1 gram/cc) as compared to the parent mineral soil (2.6–3.5 grams/cc). 

These oxidative practices reduce the depth and function of soil carbon sponges. Soil carbon sponges can be negatively affected by fire and flooding.

Global scale
It has been postulated that improved performance of soil carbon sponges at a global scale, could affect the earth's climate mainly through ecohydrology. Soil carbon sponges also serve as carbon sinks. Afforestation, reforestation and cover cropping are methods to build and improve soil carbon sponges. Afforestation provides environmental benefits, including increasing the soil quality and organic carbon levels in the soil, avoiding erosion and desertification. 

Observational evidence, that the southern Amazon rainforest triggers its own rainy season using water vapor from plant leaves, which then forms clouds above it has been reported. Airborne bacteria released from the plant leaves may seed these clouds, which result in rain droplet formations.  These findings may explain why deforestation affects the soil carbon sponge and links it to reduced rainfall.

See also

References
 
 
Carbon
Soil science